Burning Tree was an American hard rock/blues rock power trio from Los Angeles, California, United States. The band performed from the late 1980s to 1990.

The band was started in 1987, by the guitarist Marc Ford and drummer Doni Gray, and were soon joined by bassist Mark "Muddy" Dutton to complete the three piece, but not before trying half a dozen bass players, including Jay Bentley from Bad Religion. Gray and  Dutton had already been playing the local Los Angeles scene in a band called The March, and started an interest playing in a band called Citadel.

The band secured a residency at the Coconut Teaszer in Hollywood, California, from 1988-89. By the end of that year they landed a recording contract with Epic Records. The release of their self-titled debut album was met with positive reviews. However, for reasons that remain unknown, Burning Tree did not fulfill their contractual obligations, and no further recordings followed.

Marc Ford joined the Black Crowes and is pursuing a solo career. Doni Gray recorded an album with Izzy Stradlin & the Ju Ju Hounds and later started God's Hotel with Spike Gray, but now has his own band, Chromosapien. Mark 'Muddy' Dutton recorded and toured with Gilby Clarke in Col. Parker and with L. A. Guns. Dutton has formed the group Up The Dose and is a record producer and is currently touring as bass player in the Chris Robinson Brotherhood. In 2011, Gray joined L.A. Guns.

Burning Tree reunited in October 2006, and played three shows in Los Angeles. The live shows went well and the band planned to release live tracks from those performances, and record new material. The album was produced and mixed by Tim Palmer.

References

External links
Burning Tree on Myspace

Rock music groups from California